The Benelux Union, also known as simply Benelux, is a politico-economic union and formal international intergovernmental cooperation of three neighboring states in western Europe: Belgium, the Netherlands, and Luxembourg. The name is a portmanteau formed from joining the first few letters of each country's name and was first used to name the customs agreement that initiated the union (signed in 1944). It is now used more generally to refer to the geographic, economic, and cultural grouping of the three countries.

The Benelux is an economically dynamic and densely populated region, with 5.6% of the European population (29.55 million residents) and 7.9% of the joint EU GDP (€36,000/resident) on no more than 1.7% of the whole surface of the EU. Currently 37% of the total number of EU frontier workers work in the Benelux and surrounding areas. 35,000 Belgian citizens work in Luxembourg, while 37,000 Belgian citizens cross the border to work in the Netherlands each day. In addition, 12,000 Dutch and close to a thousand Luxembourg residents work in Belgium.

The main institutions of the Union are the Committee of Ministers, the Council of the Union, the General Secretariat, the Interparliamentary Consultative Council and the Benelux Court of Justice while the Benelux Office for Intellectual Property covers the same land but is not part of the Benelux Union.

The Benelux General Secretariat is located in Brussels. It is the central platform of the Benelux Union cooperation. It handles the secretariat of the Committee of Ministers, the Council of Benelux Union and the sundry committees and working parties. The General Secretariat provides day-to-day support for the Benelux cooperation on the substantive, procedural, diplomatic and logistical levels. The Secretary-General is Frans Weekers from The Netherlands and there are two deputies: Deputy Secretary-General Michel-Etienne Tilemans from Belgium and Deputy Secretary-General Jean-Claude Meyer from Luxemburg.

The presidency of the Benelux is held in turn by the three countries for a period of one year. The Netherlands holds the presidency for 2023.

History 

In 1944, exiled representatives of the three countries signed the London Customs Convention, the treaty that established the Benelux Customs Union. Ratified in 1947, the treaty was in force from 1948 until it was superseded by the Benelux Economic Union. The initial form of economic cooperation expanded steadily over time, leading to the signing of the treaty establishing the Benelux Economic Union (Benelux Economische Unie, Union Économique Benelux) on 3 February 1958 in The Hague, which came into force on 1 November 1960. Initially, the purpose of cooperation among the three partners was to put an end to customs barriers at their borders and ensure free movement of persons, capital, services, and goods between the three countries. This treaty was the first example of international economic integration in Europe since the Second World War.

The three countries therefore foreshadowed and provided the model for future European integration, such as the European Coal and Steel Community, the European Economic Community (EEC), and the European Community–European Union (EC–EU). The three partners also launched the Schengen process, which came into operation in 1985. Benelux cooperation has been constantly adapted and now goes much further than mere economic cooperation, extending to new and topical policy areas connected with security, sustainable development, and the economy. 

In 1965, the treaty establishing a Benelux Court of Justice was signed. It entered into force in 1974. The court, composed of judges from the highest courts of the three states, has to guarantee the uniform interpretation of common legal rules. This international judicial institution is located in Luxembourg.

Renewal of the agreement 
The 1958 Treaty between the Benelux countries establishing the Benelux Economic Union was limited to a period of 50 years. During the following years, and even more so after the creation of the European Union, the Benelux cooperation focused on developing other fields of activity within a constantly changing international context.

At the end of the 50 years, the governments of the three Benelux countries decided to renew the agreement, taking into account the new aspects of the Benelux-cooperation – such as security – and the new federal government structure of Belgium. The original establishing treaty, set to expire in 2010, was replaced by a new legal framework (called the Treaty revising the Treaty establishing the Benelux Economic Union), which was signed on 17 June 2008.

The new treaty has no set time limit and the name of the Benelux Economic Union changed to Benelux Union to reflect the broad scope on the union. The main objectives of the treaty are the continuation and enlargement of the cooperation between the three member states within a larger European context. The renewed treaty explicitly foresees the possibility that the Benelux countries will cooperate with other European member states or with regional cooperation structures. The new Benelux cooperation focuses on three main topics: internal market and economic union, sustainability, justice and internal affairs. The number of structures in the renewed Treaty has been reduced and thus simplified.

Activities since 2008
Benelux seeks region-to-region cooperation, be it with France and Germany (North Rhine-Westphalia) or beyond with the Baltic States, the Nordic Council, the Visegrad countries, or even further. In 2018 a renewed political declaration was adopted between Benelux and North Rhine-Westphalia to give cooperation a further impetus.

The Benelux is particularly active in the field of intellectual property. The three countries established a Benelux Trademarks Office and a Benelux Designs Office, both situated in The Hague. In 2005, they concluded a treaty establishing the Benelux Office for Intellectual Property, which replaced both offices upon its entry into force on 1 September 2006. This organisation is the official body for the registration of trademarks and designs in the Benelux. In addition, it offers the possibility to formally record the existence of ideas, concepts, designs, prototypes and the like.

Some examples of recent Benelux initiatives include: automatic level recognition of diplomas and degrees within the Benelux for bachelor's and master's programs in 2015, and for all other degrees in 2018; common road inspections in 2014; and a Benelux pilot with digital consignment notes (e-CMR) in 2017; a new Benelux Treaty on Police Cooperation in 2018, providing for direct access to each other's police databases and population registers within the limits of national legislation, and allowing some police forces to cross borders in some situations. The Benelux is also committed to working together on adaptation to climate change. A joint political declaration in July 2020 called on the European Commission to prioritise cycling in European climate policy and Sustainable Transport strategies, to co-finance the construction of cycling infrastructure, and to provide funds to stimulate cycling policy.

On 5 June 2018 the Benelux Treaty celebrated its 60 years of existence. In 2018, a Benelux Youth Parliament was created.

In addition to cooperation based on a Treaty, there is also political cooperation in the Benelux context, including summits of the Benelux government leaders. In 2019 a Benelux summit was held in Luxembourg. In 2020, a Benelux summit was held – online, due to the COVID-19 pandemic – under Dutch Presidency on 7 October between the prime ministers.

Cooperation with other geopolitical regions

The Benelux countries also work together in the so-called Pentalateral Energy Forum, a regional cooperation group formed of five members—the Benelux states, France, Germany, Austria, and Switzerland. Formed on 6 June 2007, the ministers for energy from the various countries represent a total of 200 million residents and 40% of the European electricity network.

In 2017 the members of the Benelux, the Baltic Assembly, three members of the Nordic Council (Sweden, Denmark and Finland), and all the other countries EU member states, sought to increase cooperation in the Digital Single Market, as well as discussing social matters, the Economic and Monetary Union of the European Union, immigration and defence cooperation. Foreign relations in the wake of Russia's annexation of Crimea and the 2017 Turkish constitutional referendum were also on the agenda.

Since 2008 the Benelux Union works together with the German Land (state) North Rhine-Westphalia.

In 2018 Benelux Union signed a declaration with France to strengthen cross-border cooperation.

Politics

Benelux institutions
Under the 2008 treaty there are five Benelux institutions: the Benelux Committee of Ministers, the Benelux Council, the Benelux Parliament, the Benelux Court of Justice, the Benelux Secretariat General. Beside these five institutions, the Benelux Organisation for Intellectual Property is also an independent organisation.

Benelux Committee of Ministers:

The Committee of Ministers is the supreme decision-making body of the Benelux. It includes at least one representative at ministerial level from the three countries. Its composition varies according to its agenda. The ministers determine the orientations and priorities of Benelux cooperation. The presidency of the Committee rotates between the three countries on an annual basis.

Benelux Council:

The council is composed of senior officials from the relevant ministries. Its composition varies according to its agenda. The council's main task is to prepare the dossiers for the ministers.

Benelux InterParliamentary Consultative Council:
The Benelux Parliament (officially referred to as an "Interparliamentary Consultative Council") was created in 1955. This parliamentary assembly is composed of 49 members from the respective national parliaments (21 members of the Dutch parliament, 21 members of the Belgian national and regional parliaments, and 7 members of the Luxembourg parliament). Its members inform and advise their respective governments on all Benelux matters. On 20 January 2015, the governments of the three countries, including, as far as Belgium is concerned, the community and regional governments, signed in Brussels the Treaty of the Benelux Interparliamentary Assembly. This treaty entered into force on 1 August 2019. This superseded the 1955 Convention on the Consultative Interparliamentary Council for the Benelux. The official name has been largely obsolete in daily practice for a number of years: both internally in the Benelux and in external references, the name Benelux Parliament has been used de facto for a number of years now.

Benelux Court of Justice:

The Benelux Court of Justice is an international court. Its mission is to promote uniformity in the application of Benelux legislation. When faced with difficulty interpreting a common Benelux legal rule, national courts must seek an interpretive ruling from the Benelux Court, which subsequently renders a binding decision. The members of the Court are appointed from among the judges of the 'Cour de cassation' of Belgium, the 'Hoge Raad of the Netherlands' and the 'Cour de cassation' of Luxembourg.

Benelux General Secretariat:

The General Secretariat, which is based in Brussels, forms the cooperation platform of the Benelux Union. It acts as the secretariat of the Committee of Ministers, the council and various commissions and working groups. The General Secretariat has years of expertise in the area of Benelux cooperation and is familiar with the policy agreements and differences between the three countries. Building on what already been achieved, the General Secretariat puts its knowledge, network and experience at the service of partners and stakeholders who endorse its mission. It initiates, supports and monitors cooperation results in the areas of economy, sustainability and security.

Benelux works together on the basis of an annual plan embedded in a four-year joint work programme.

Benelux legal instruments 
The Benelux Union involves intergovernmental cooperation.

The Treaty establishing the Benelux Union explicitly provides that the Benelux Committee of Ministers can resort to four legal instruments (art. 6, paragraph 2, under a), f), g) and h)):

1. Decisions

Decisions are legally binding regulations for implementing the Treaty establishing the Benelux Union or other Benelux treaties.

Their legally binding force concerns the Benelux states (and their sub-state entities), which have to implement them. However, they have no direct effect towards individual citizens or companies (notwithstanding any indirect protection of their rights based on such decisions as a source of international law). Only national provisions implementing a decision can directly create rights and obligations for citizens or companies.

2. Agreements

The Committee of Ministers can draw up agreements, which are then submitted to the Benelux states (and/or their sub-state entities) for signature and subsequent parliamentary ratification. These agreements can deal with any subject matter, also in policy areas that are not yet covered by cooperation in the framework of the Benelux Union.

These are in fact traditional treaties, with the same direct legally binding force towards both authorities and citizens or companies. The negotiations do however take place in the established context of the Benelux working groups and institutions, rather than on an ad hoc basis.

3. Recommendations

Recommendations are non-binding orientations, adopted at ministerial level, which underpin the functioning of the Benelux Union. These (policy) orientations may not be legally binding, but given their adoption at the highest political level and their legal basis vested directly in the Treaty, they do entail a strong moral obligation for any authority concerned in the Benelux countries.

4. Directives

Directives of the Committee of Ministers are mere inter-institutional instructions towards the Benelux Council and/or the Secretariat-General, for which they are binding. This instrument has so far only been used occasionally, basically in order to organize certain activities within a Benelux working group or to give them impetus.

All four instruments require the unanimous approval of the members of the Committee of Ministers (and, in the case of agreements, subsequent signature and ratification at national level).

Characteristics

Countries

Associated territories

See also 
 Admiral Benelux
 EU Med Group
 Baltic Assembly
 Inner Six
 Low Countries
 Nordic Council
 United Kingdom of the Netherlands
 Visegrád Group
 Polish–Czechoslovak confederation
 Proposed United Kingdom Confederation

Notes

References

Further reading

 Willy van Ryckeghem : Benelux in: The European Economy - Growth and Crisis, Andrea Boltho, Editor, Oxford University Press, 1982, .

External links 

 Official sites
  (in Dutch and French)
 Benelux Court of Justice
 Benelux Office for Intellectual Property 

 
Regions of Europe
History of the Low Countries
Economic history of Belgium
Economic history of Luxembourg
Economic history of the Netherlands
1944 establishments in the Netherlands
1944 establishments in Belgium
1944 establishments in Luxembourg
International economic organizations
Supranational unions
Organizations established in 1944
Northwestern Europe
Bottom-up regional groups within the European Union